KWJP (89.7 FM) is a radio station licensed to serve the community of Paola, Kansas. The station is owned by United Pentecostal Local Churches, Inc. It airs a Christian radio format.

The station was assigned the KCPU call letters by the Federal Communications Commission on March 21, 2008. The station changed its call sign to KCPK on May 7, 2008, and to KWJP on January 20, 2010

References

External links

Radio stations established in 2011
2011 establishments in Kansas
WJP
Miami County, Kansas